Catherine Levison is the author of four books.  She is also a public speaker to parenting, homeschooling and educational audiences throughout the United States and Canada.  She is also a columnist for The Link magazine. Levison lives with her family in the Puget Sound region of Washington state.

Career
Levison's workshops, articles, books and seminars are based on her extensive research into the teaching methods and educational philosophies of Charlotte Mason, a British educator from the last century whose techniques are currently receiving renewed interested, especially in American private and home schools.

"Homeschooling and parenting are intertwined in such a way that they can hardly be seen as separate concepts. ... As one overlaps with the other, we find that all parents are home educators to some degree." ~Catherine Levison

Levison is a frequent workshop presenter and keynote speaker at homeschooling conventions.  She also conducts all-day educational how-to seminars throughout the United States and Canada for parents, teachers, and home educators.

Publications
A Charlotte Mason Education: A How-to Manual,  (SourceBooks)
More Charlotte Mason Education,  (SourceBooks)
A Literary Education: An Annontated Book List,  (SourceBooks)
"No One Ever Asked Me That; Conversations on the Afterlife",

References

External links
 http://www.catherinelevison.com/
 Charlotte Mason & Home Education
 Interview with Catherine Levison

American non-fiction writers
Living people
Writers from Washington (state)
Homeschooling advocates
American women non-fiction writers
Year of birth missing (living people)
21st-century American women